Looking Back to Yesterday is a 1986 compilation album featuring a collection of tracks from singer Michael Jackson and The Jackson 5. As part of Motown's Never-Before-Released series, all songs were previously unreleased except for "Love's Gone Bad" and "I Was Made to Love Her"; alternate versions were released in 1979 on the Motown Jackson 5 compilation Boogie.

The album was re-released in August 1991 and re-titled Looking Back to Yesterday: A Young Michael and sold over half a million copies. It was re-released again as part of Hello World: The Motown Solo Collection in 2009.

Track listing
All songs by Michael Jackson except tracks 2, 3, 4, 7, 9 and 11, which are by The Jackson 5; all tracks produced by Hal Davis except track 6 (Jerry Marcellino and Mel Larson) and 12 (Bob Crewe). All writer info found in the Hello World: The Motown Solo Collection (2009) liner notes.

Singles
"Love's Gone Bad" (b/w "I Hear a Symphony") (released as a promotional single in Canada).

References

External links
 Looking Back to Yesterday info

1986 compilation albums
Michael Jackson compilation albums
Albums produced by Hal Davis
Motown compilation albums